Paxton is a city in Ford County, Illinois, United States.  The population was 4,473 at the 2010 census.  It is the county seat of Ford County.

History

The town was initially named Prairie City in the late 1840s, then Prospect City by an Illinois Central Railroad official in 1855. However, as Wilbur W. Sauer says that residents noted the town was "all prospect and no city." In 1859, it was renamed for Sir Joseph Paxton, architect of the Crystal Palace, who was a major shareholder in the Illinois Central Railroad, which in 1856 was the longest span of railroad in the world (Chicago to Cairo). It was rumored that Paxton was interested in organizing an English settlement in Illinois. The colony never materialized, but the town kept the name. Founded in 1859, Paxton celebrated its sesquicentennial in 2009.

Augustana College was located in Paxton from 1863 to 1875, aided by a community effort led by recent Swedish immigrants to fund educational and cultural opportunities for citizens.

An early public high school was established in 1872; it served the surrounding area for the next several decades, culminating in the formation of a community high school district in May 1920. The local school's mascot was the Paxton Mustangs until consolidation with the Buckley-Loda Rockets district in 1990 formed the current Paxton-Buckley-Loda School District, known as the PBL Panthers. The school is a member of the IESA and IHSA for interscholastic sports and activities.

The Ford County Courthouse in Paxton was built in 1906, and boasts many murals painted by the Works Progress Administration during the 1930s.

On June 22, 1919, former President William Howard Taft visited Paxton while on his way to Champaign. After disembarking from a long train ride, Taft delivered a speech in the Pells Park Pavilion in favor of U.S. entry into the newly formed League of Nations. Taft's appearance is a testament to the Paxton Chautauqua, which was held in Pells Park from 1905 to 1930, attracting musicians, speakers and entertainment from all over the United States. Taft is one of four U.S. Presidents to visit Ford County, joining William McKinley (Gibson City in 1897), Richard Nixon (Melvin as vice president in 1957), and Gerald Ford (Melvin in 1974).

From 1865 to 2007, the Paxton Daily Record was published in Paxton, making the paper one of the longest-running daily newspapers of its size in the state of Illinois. Today, the Ford County Chronicle, a digital publication managed by the former paper's staff, continues to publish local news, sports and other event information.

Due to Paxton having the highest elevation points in the area, the Illinois Central Railroad dug out ground so that the railroad could move at the same elevation, but underneath the city of Paxton. When the railroad was cut (around the 1920s), several bridges were built across the railroad to connect the east and west sides of Paxton. Presently, there are three vehicular bridges, which are located at Holmes Street, Pells Street and Patton Street, and a pedestrian bridge at Orleans Street.

The town also hosts the Historic Brick Water Tower & Ford County Historical Society Museum, which opened on July 4, 2007. The Paxton Foundation, a local historical preservation group, is currently restoring the Old Ford County Jail and Sheriff's Residence, built in 1871. Located on West State Street adjacent to the Courthouse, it will be turned into a museum. Another local building on the National Register of Historic Places is the Paxton Carnegie Library, which was built in 1903.

The community has many homes built in the late 19th century, some of which are now part of an historic homes walking tour. Many of the home owners have won awards from various preservation and restoration societies for their efforts in maintaining the architectural heritage of these important landmarks. The Paxton Area Chamber of Commerce and PRIDE in Paxton, a member of the Illinois Main Street Program, currently promote local businesses and events in the historic downtown district.

Geography

Paxton is located at  (40.458745, -88.095784).

Paxton is directly served by three major highways (I-57, U.S. Route 45, and Illinois Route 9), the Illinois Central Railroad, and a municipal airport with a  landing strip .

Demographics

As of the census of 2000, there were 4,525 people, 1,776 households, and 1,198 families residing in the city. The racial makeup of the city was 90.3% White, 7.5% African American, 0.07% Native American, 0.07% Asian, 0.55% from other races, and 0.86% from two or more races. Hispanic or Latino of any race were 1.64% of the population.

There were 1,776 households, out of which 33.2% had children under the age of 18 living with them, 54.7% were married couples living together, 8.8% had a female householder with no husband present, and 32.5% were non-families. 29.7% of all households were made up of individuals, and 14.5% had someone living alone who was 65 years of age or older.  The average household size was 2.45 and the average family size was 3.02.

In the city, the population was spread out, with 26.1% under the age of 18, 7.7% from 18 to 24, 28.0% from 25 to 44, 19.4% from 45 to 64, and 18.7% who were 65 years of age or older.  The median age was 38 years. For every 100 females, there were 92.3 males. For every 100 females age 18 and over, there were 86.5 males.

The median income for a household in the city was $37,804, and the median income for a family was $44,256. Males had a median income of $31,140 versus $23,555 for females. The per capita income for the city was $18,617.  About 4.2% of families and 4.8% of the  population were below the poverty line, including 3.7% of those under age 18 and 4.8% of those age 65 or over.

The education level of the population age 25 and older in Paxton is as follows:

 High school or higher: 88.0%
 Bachelor's degree or higher: 13.4%
 Graduate or professional degree: 4.4%

Notable people

 Charles Bogardus, lived in Paxton; Illinois state legislator. businessman, and farmer
 Curtiss LaQ. Day, born and raised in Paxton; an early pioneer of aviation.
 Antoinette Downing, historical preservationist born in Paxton
 Gustaf Johnson, three time mayor of Paxton and member of the Illinois House of Representatives from 1920 to 1936
 Pete Larson, running back for the Washington Redskins; grew up in Paxton.
 Lena Morrow Lewis, political activist, orator, and journalist, graduated from high school in Paxton.
 Mush March, player for 1934 and 1938 Stanley Cup champion Chicago Blackhawks, lived and died in Paxton.
 Tom Meents, champion monster truck driver; lives in Paxton.
 Sid Mercer, sportswriter who covered mostly boxing and baseball in St. Louis and in New York City.
 William H. Plackett, born and raised in Paxton; the sixth Master Chief Petty Officer of the Navy.

References

External links

City of Paxton
Paxton-Buckley-Loda School District
Paxton Park District
Paxton Area Chamber of Commerce

Cities in Illinois
Cities in Ford County, Illinois
County seats in Illinois
Populated places established in 1859
1859 establishments in Illinois